Hong Kong competed at the Commonwealth and British Empire Games as a British colony or dependent territory from 1934 to 1994. The abbreviation for Hong Kong was HKG. In 1997, the United Kingdom handed Hong Kong over to the People's Republic of China, meaning it could no longer participate.

Overall medal tally

After the last games attended by Hong Kong in 1994, Hong Kong had 17 medals, see All-time tally of medals.

Gold Medals

 Men Bowls Fours – Abdul R. Kitchell, Clementi Delgado, George Angelo Souza, Robert E. da Silva 1970
 Men Bowls Fours – Kin Fun Phillip Chok, Majid Jr. Hassen, Omar Kachong Dallah, Robert E. da Silva 1978 Team Manager Jeffrey H Murphy
 Men Bowls Doubles – Clementi Delgado and Eric Liddell 1978 Team Manager Jeffrey H Murphy
 Men Rapid Fire Pistol – Solomon Lee 1982
 Mixed Doubles Badminton – Chan Chi Choi and Amy Chan 1990

Silver Medals

 Men Four Bowl – Alfred E. Coates, Jose A. da Luz, Raoul F. da Luz, Robert S. Gourlay 1954
 Men Single Bowl – Mark McMahon 1990

Bronze Medals

 Men 10m Air Pistol - Gilbert U 1986
 Men 50m Free Pistol – Ho Kar Fai 1986
 Men 50m Pairs Free Pistol – Gilbert U and Ho Kar-Fai 1986
 Men 50m Free Pistol – Gilbert U 1990
 Women Four Bowl – Jenny Wallis, Natividad Rozario, Sau Ling Chau, Yee Lai Lee 1990
 Mixed Team Badminton – Amy Chan, Chi Choi Chan, Kin Ngai Chan, Man Wa Chan, Mei Yin Chui, Pak Kum Ng, Siu Kwong Chan, Yick Kei Yeung, Yin Sat Cheng 1990
 Men Visually Impaired Singles Bowl – Carlos Braga Antunes 1994
 Women Visually Impaired Singles Bowl – Sunny Tang 1994
 Men Single Bowl – Ken Wallis 1994

Overall standings

All-time Hong Kong Commonwealth Competitors

List of athletes who have competed for the Games for Hong Kong, but did not place in medal standings:

Archery

 Jimuel Lin

Fencing

 R. A. Da Costa – Men's Individual Foil and Individual Sabre
 Jose Marçal

Track

 Lee Tze-Fai – Men's 100m and 200m
 Yeung Sai Mo – Men's 500m and 1500m
 Yuko Gordon – Women's 3000m
 Lau Chi-keung – Men's 400m and 400m H

Badminton

 Man Hing Wong
 Sze Yu
 Chuen Wong
 Tin Cheung Chan
 Har Ping Wong
 Chun Mui Tong
 Selwyn Kwok
 Amy Chan
 Lap Chuen Wong
 Man Hing Wong

Boxing

 Kam Chan Boxing – Men's Bantamweight
 Choi Wing Boxing – Men's Flyweight Division (51 kg)
 Pok Wong Boxing – Men's Light Welterweight Division (63.5 kg)

Road Race (Cycling)

 Tat-Ming Chow Cycling – Men's Road Race (185 km)
 Yiu-Ming Fong Cycling – Men's Road Race (185 km)
 Chung-Yam Hung Cycling – Men's Road Race (185 km)

Diving
 Billy Yang Diving – Men's 3m Springboard Diving
 Andrew Tang Diving – Men's 3m Springboard Diving and  Diving – Men's High Diving/Tower
 Amy Lam Diving – Women's 3m Springboard Diving

Shooting

 Peter Rull Shooting – Men's 50m Rifle Prone
 Dick Winney Shooting – Men's 50m Rifle Prone
 Janie Lee Shooting – Men's 50m/Free Pistol and Men's 50m/Free Pistol (Team)
 Peter Dawson Shooting – Men's Air Pistol
 Shu-Ming Cheng, Kevin Ngan Shooting – Men's Clay Pigeon Trap
 Chung-Kin Ho Shooting – Men's Rapid Fire Pistol
 Peter Hung Shooting – Men's Skeet
 Tsun-Man Chow Shooting – Men's Skeet

Swimming

 Yiu-Fai Leung – Men's 100m Backstroke
 Yuen Chung Swimming – Men's 100m Backstroke
 Lotta Flink – Women's 100m Backstroke, Women's 200m Backstroke, Women's 200m Individual Medley, Women's 4 × 100 m Freestyle Relay, Women's 4 × 100 m Medley Relay
 Kathryn Wong – Women's 100m Backstroke, Women's 100m Butterfly, Women's 200m Backstroke, Women's 200m Individual Medley, Women's 4 × 100 m Freestyle Relay, Women's 4 × 100 m Medley Relay
 Kam Shing Watt  – Men's 100m Breaststroke and Swimming – Men's 200m Breaststroke
 Alex Tang Swimming – Men's 100m Breaststroke and Swimming – Men's 200m Breaststroke, Men's 4 × 100 m Medley Relay
 Lai Yee Chow Swimming – Women's 100m Breaststroke, Women's 200m Breaststroke, Women's 4 × 100 m Medley Relay
 Johnny Li – Men's 100m Butterfly, Men's 100m Freestyle, Men's 4 × 100 m Freestyle Relay, Men's 4 × 100 m Medley Relay, Men's 4 × 200 m Freestyle Relay
 Shiu Hang Chan – Men's 100m Butterfly, Men's 4 × 100 m Freestyle Relay, Men's 4 × 200 m Freestyle Relay
 Yi Ming Tsang Swimming – Men's 100m Butterfly, Men's 200m Butterfly, Men's 400m Freestyle, Men's 4 × 100 m Freestyle Relay, Men's 4 × 100 m Medley Relay, Men's 4 × 200 m Freestyle Relay, Men's 200m Freestyle
 Fenella Ng Swimming – Women's 100m Butterfly, Women's 200m Butterfly, Women's 400m Freestyle, Women's 800m Freestyle, Women's 4 × 100 m Freestyle Relay, Women's 4 × 100 m Medley Relay
 Che Hung Lau  Swimming – Men's 100m Freestyle, Men's 200m Freestyle
 Yuen Chung – Men's 200m Backstroke, Men's 4 × 100 m Freestyle Relay, Men's 4 × 200 m Freestyle Relay
 Yiu Fai Leung Swimming – Men's 200m Backstroke, Men's 4 × 100 m Medley Relay
 Wai Lai – Swimming – Women's 4 × 100 m Freestyle Relay

See also

 Hong Kong at the Olympics
 Hong Kong at the Asian Games
 Sports Federation and Olympic Committee of Hong Kong, China – formerly Sports Federation and Olympic Committee of Hong Kong

References

External links
The official Commonwealth Games website shows participation by Hong Kong in eleven Games: 1934, then 1954, 1958, 1962, 1970, 1974, 1978, 1982, 1986, 1990 and 1994. Note that while the Results by Country table for 1934 does not show Hong Kong, the introductory remarks say that Hong Kong participated.
The Australian Commonwealth Games Association website also shows a team from Hong Kong at the 1934 Games.

 
Hong Kong and the Commonwealth of Nations
Nations at the Commonwealth Games